Coolidge House may refer to:

Coolidge House (Helena-West Helena, Arkansas)
Coolidge Homestead, Plymouth Notch, Vermont
Calvin Coolidge House, Northampton, Massachusetts
Josiah Coolidge House, Cambridge, Massachusetts

See also
Wentworth-Coolidge Mansion, Portsmouth, New Hampshire
Coolidge-Rising House, Spokane, Washington